Stranded is a 2002 television adventure drama film directed by Charles Beeson, based on Johann David Wyss's 1812 novel The Swiss Family Robinson. It stars Liam Cunningham, Brana Bajic, Roger Allam and Jesse Spencer.

Plot
PART ONE

After being falsely accused of a crime he never committed, Pastor David Robinson is shipped off to a penal colony to serve out an eight-year sentence. His wife Lara and their four children (seventeen-year-old Ernst, fifteen-year-old Fritz, ten-year-old Sarah, and nine-year-old Jacob) are allowed to accompany him. After several days at sea, a raging storm strikes the ship and the captain is killed by a fallen mast while trying to restore order to his terrified crew. Under the orders of the ruthless second-in-command Thomas Blunt and his fellow officers Pickles and Roberts, most of the crew members are forced to abandon ship, while the Robinson family are trapped below deck. During the confusion, Jacob gets separated from his family and is carried out to sea on a lifeboat carrying Blunt, Pickles, and several other members of the crew. The ship strikes against some rocks and gets stuck fast, leaving David, Lara, and their remaining three children (Ernst, Fritz, and Sarah) stranded on board.

The next day, the Robinson family gets off the ship and swims to a nearby island, where they are forced to rely on coconuts for food and rainwater to quench their thirst. Fritz and Ernst are sent to scour the coves on the shores for any sign of the launches, but they are unable to spot them and discover that they are too far away from any available land in sight. While returning to the beach to regroup with their parents and sister, the two boys are chased by a wild boar and Ernst ends up dislocating his shoulder. Upon learning from his sons that they failed to find the launches and discovered that they are stranded on a desert island, David informs his family that they must work together to survive.

David, Fritz, and Ernst return to the ship the following day and begin salvaging as much as they can find on board, including a few muskets, several barrels of gunpowder and shot, a chest of tools, rope, clothes, books, and other valuable supplies. They also find two crates of chickens as a reliable source of meat and eggs, and they also rescue two dogs that they found trapped in the captain’s cabin. After bringing their supplies and animals back to shore, the Robinson family learn how to survive on their own. They discover and harvest various fruits and vegetables, build a tent for shelter, and even capture a young buffalo to tame and train to help them with pulling heavy timber for their shelter. One morning, Sarah spots an English frigate in the distance and informs her family of her discovery. David and Ernst suggest that they bring some more supplies from the wrecked ship in case they fail to signal the English ship, but Lara and Fritz inform them that they must destroy the ship to attract the attention of the ship’s crew if they ever have the chance of being rescued. Begrudgingly, David swims over to the wreckage and blows up the ship in the hope of signaling the English frigate, but the desperate attempt fails and the explosion destroys the remaining supplies that the Robinsons could have salvaged in order to survive.

Limited to the few supplies and tools they managed to salvage from the ship, the Robinson family proceed to build a new home up in the trees. One day, Sarah meets and befriends a local native named Namatiti, but is dragged away by her father and scolded for putting herself in mortal danger. Angry at their father for passing poor judgment on Namatiti and being selfish for his own reasons, Fritz and Sarah reject their father and Fritz goes with the native in his boat. Fritz and Namatiti travel to the opposite side of the island, catch an abundant supply of fish, and also uncover a small supply of gold coins from the wreckage of a ship that sunk to the bottom of the shallows.

They return to the Robinson family’s camp a few days later, only to learn from David and Ernst that Lara had been bitten by a snake while protecting her daughter from the deadly serpent. Sarah informs her father and brothers that it was black with yellow stripes, which Ernst identifies as a venomous banded krait, or Bungarus fasciatus. Desperate to save his wife from dying of snakebite, David sends his sons and Namatiti into the rainforest to bring back some medicinal herbs and roots. Using the herbs and roots they collected, Namatiti tends to Lara’s snakebite and successfully heals her. Lara slowly recovers from the snakebite and the entire Robinson family expresses their gratitude for Namatiti, who pledges his friendship to them in return. The family then goes for a swim in a lagoon that they found during their exploration of the island.

Meanwhile, Jacob Robinson, along with Blunt, Pickles, and the few survivors of the convict ship are picked up by a Malay trading ship and nursed back to health. Over the next several days, Blunt takes Jacob under his wing and the boy begins to look upon the ruthless Blunt as a father figure. However, Jacob witnessed Blunt silently murder the Malaysian captain and throw him overboard and is nervous about what he saw. With Pickles and Roberts to back him up, Blunt takes command of the ship’s crew and even proclaims that they will raid English ships that they encounter at sea. From that moment onward, Blunt, Jacob, Pickles, Roberts, and the Malaysian crew members become pirates and dangerous enemies to the British Empire.

PART TWO

Seven years have passed and Blunt and his pirate crew have successfully made war with the English navy. Jacob, now sixteen years old, has become a loyal follower of Blunt and a cunning member of the pirate crew. During one of their night raids on an English frigate, Jacob's pirates successfully kidnap twenty-year-old Emily Montrose, the beautiful daughter of a sea-captain. Captain Montrose swears that he will hang Blunt and his men if they ever harm his daughter before promising Emily that he will rescue her. Emily spends several days in captivity on board Blunt’s ship, but only sees Captain Blunt and Pickles in person several times. During a brawl between Jacob and Pickles which distracts the captain and the rest of the crew, Emily escapes from the ship and swims to a nearby island which, unbeknownst to her, is the home of the stranded Robinson family.

Meanwhile, the Robinson family has successfully established an island paradise for themselves which also become a self-sustaining farm and plantation. They have managed to build a small number of houses up in the trees, a water wheel that supplies them with water for drinking, cooking, and washing, and a collection of post fences that help pen up their animals and fence in their gardens and orchards. In addition to their buffalo, dogs, and chickens, the Robinsons have also added goats, honeybees, and a pet monkey to their menagerie of animals. They have successfully planted numerous crops which give them fruits and vegetables to last them all year round. David and Lara’s three children have also grown up into young, respectful, and hard-working adults, with Ernst now twenty-four, Fritz twenty-two, and Sarah eighteen years old.

One day, David sends Fritz and Ernst to the opposite side of the island to bring some more kale and lettuce to replenish their dwindling supply of edible greens. The two brothers discover a pirate ship near the cove and hide out of sight as they watch a rowboat carrying six armed pirates rowing back to the ship. Shortly afterwards, they find and rescue Emily Montrose, who has successfully escaped and hidden from the pirates on the island. They take her back to their home and introduce her to their parents and Sarah, who bring her into their tree house and slowly nurse her back to health. Ernst and Fritz then proceed to tell their parents and sister about the pirates and how Emily's father has been chasing them for months. Fearing that the pirates will arrive at their island first before Captain Montrose does, David informs his family that they must make preparations to fight the pirates when they arrive. They rebuild the signal fire they had put up on the highest point of the island years prior, and set up a line of defenses around the hilltop should the pirates chase them up there. They make several rockets out of some of the spare gunpowder they had salvaged from the convict ship years earlier, and keep their guns loaded to defend themselves.

Over the next few weeks, Emily soon becomes a love interest with Fritz and Ernst. She is soon accepted into the family and is loved and respected by everyone. She soon meets Namatiti when he arrives at the island to visit the Robinsons, and though nervous about him at first, Emily soon realizes that the native is a loyal, respectful friend of the family who has taken such good care of her. One afternoon, Fritz and Emily go for a swim in the lagoon together. Fritz then hesitantly swims up to Emily and kisses her. He then kisses her again, but Emily pushes him away and tells him that she's getting out of the water. Fritz tries to reconcile with Emily for his behavior, but she rejects him, getting out of the water and walking away. Rejected and heartbroken, a depressed Fritz shuns himself away from the rest of the family and no longer goes near or speaks to Emily, even though he watches her from a good distance away as she talks and laughs with the rest of the family. Over the next few days, Fritz's behavior is soon noticed by Lara, who goes to him one afternoon and asks him what is wrong. He tells his mother that he hates the island and wishes to leave it, even though Lara points out that she thought he was the happiest to live on the island. She points out to Fritz that Emily was looking for him down at the cove earlier that day, hoping that he would like to go swimming with her again, but Fritz declines and angrily states that Emily has Ernst to swim with. Lara soon learns about what had happened the last time Fritz and Emily were together and begs her son to give Emily time to adjust and to be patient with her, but Fritz doesn't believe her and tells her that she doesn't understand how he feels at the moment. After a little more kindly advice which cheers him up a little, Fritz apologizes for his past behavior and Lara forgives him.

Meanwhile, Namatiti returns to his native village, only to discover that Thomas Blunt and his pirate crew have arrived in search of treasure. They capture Namatiti and hold him hostage, threatening to massacre his tribe and burn the village if he doesn’t take them to the treasure at once. He takes the pirates to the shipwreck where he and Fritz had uncovered the small supply of gold coins seven years earlier, but the pirates find no treasure. The next morning, Namatiti breaks free of his bonds and escaped from his captors. Enraged at having lost their hostage, Blunt and his crew sail down to the island where the Robinsons were dwelling, but unbeknownst to them, Namatiti follows them to the island. The pirates soon arrive at the Robinson family’s home, where they tie up the dogs and proceed onto where they encounter the Robinson family preparing to enjoy an afternoon meal. Blunt is surprised when he discovers that Pastor Robinson and his family had survived all those past seven years, just as much as the Robinson family are when they recognize Blunt, Pickles, and Roberts have survived the fury of the storm. David and Lara are both shocked and devastated when they meet their long-lost son Jacob alive and standing before them as a young man, but also as a ruthless member of Blunt’s pirate crew. Roberts finds Emily and drags her out to reveal her to Blunt, but a furious Fritz orders Roberts to leave her alone and punches him when he goads him. Blunt calmly informs the Robinson family that he and his men are not savages and wish for food and drink, which Lara reluctantly agrees that they shall have. For the next two days, Blunt and his pirate crew remain in the Robinsons’ home and order them around as if they were their servants. Lara and David give Blunt and his men the gold that Fritz and Namatiti had found in the shipwreck years prior, hoping that they would leave now that they had gotten their money, but Blunt and his men refuse to leave just yet. Lara and David watch helplessly as Jacob stays with the pirates under Captain Blunt’s watchful eye, knowing full well that Blunt gives Jacob little choice between remaining true to his family or the pirates.

One morning, Lara discovers an English warship far off in the distance and quietly informs David, Fritz, Ernst, Sarah, and Emily of her discovery. They quietly slip away into the jungle and make their way up the hill to where they had set up their defenses and the signal fire. The pirates soon learn of the approaching English warship and also discover that the Robinsons were making their way up to the hilltop, so they pursue the Robinsons in the hopes of taking them hostage and preventing them from lighting the signal fire. Armed with their muskets and makeshift rockets, as well as rolling logs and barrels down the hillside, the Robinsons struggle to repel Blunt’s pirate crew as they ascend the hillside. A battle ensues between the Robinsons and the pirates, in which several of Blunt’s men are killed or wounded. During the battle, Jacob tries to stop the pirates from attempting to kill his family, but he is stunned by one of the exploding rockets fired by Sarah and is dragged away to safety by Blunt. Fritz manages to light the signal fire with a makeshift stick of dynamite, which draws the attention of the crew on board the English warship who start firing their cannons at the pirates on the hill. Blunt orders for his men to fall back to the boats, in which he, Pickles, Roberts, Jacob, and three other pirates retreat down the hill to the beaches.

The surviving pirates reach the boats and attempt to board them in their desperation to escape, but Blunt refuses to leave without the gold he had left behind at the Robinsons' treehouse. Jacob also refuses to leave the island without the captain, so he jumps off the rowboat and goes after him while Roberts, Pickles, and the few remaining pirates escape back to their ship for safety. Blunt retrieves the gold coins he finds and prepares to burn down the Robinsons' home, but David, Fritz, and Jacob arrive in time to stop him just as he sets one of the houses on fire. In the struggle that follows, Blunt shoots and wounds Fritz, Jacob is pushed off the bridge by Blunt, and David and Blunt struggle desperately in an attempt to overpower one or the other. Lara and Emily tend to a wounded Fritz, while Ernst and Sarah struggle to put out the fire that Blunt had started before it can spread to the rest of their home. Just as Blunt overpowers David and draws his sword to finish him off, Namatiti hurls a spear at the pirate captain and mortally wounds him as his spear pierces him in the stomach. As Blunt lay dying, David tries to convince him to grip his hand and submit to the will of God in order to save himself. Blunt refuses, stating that he should have listened to Jacob and left with his crew instead of staying behind for the gold, as well as the fact that he is more fortunate to die than to fall into the hands of the British authorities. Blunt dies in David's arms, and Jacob mourns the loss of a man who had watched over him for seven years before he and his mother Lara embrace at long last.

With Captain Thomas Blunt dead and the pirates killed or driven off, Emily is reunited with her father and tells him everything that had happened. Captain Montrose informs David Robinson that even though the English authorities back in England see him as a felon, Captain Montrose sees him as the man who has saved his daughter from a living death. He informs David that his seven years on the island would be sentence and promises him that he will do what he can to argue his case before the authorities and grant him his freedom. Lara is greatly relieved that her youngest son Jacob has been returned to her family and that her husband would soon regain his freedom at last. Sarah comforts Namatiti as he cleans his bloodstained dagger in the ocean's water and thanks him for helping them in their fight against Blunt and his pirate crew. Fritz goes off later that afternoon to find Emily and speak to her again, only to discover her and Ernst talking about returning to England together. The next day, as Fritz is in the middle of mending the fishing nets, Emily goes to him to speak to him again, but he admits to see her with Ernst the day before. Emily asks him what he sees with his heart and not his eyes, to which he replies that he sees Safety Cove which gave him and his family water, fish, and life. He also admits his feelings to Emily, to which Emily forgives Fritz for his past behavior and also admits to Fritz that she had fallen in love with him since she first saw him. Jacob also gives to Sarah her doll Isabelle, which he had kept for the past seven years so that he would never forget his family, and the two of them embrace happily.

Captain Montrose, David, and Lara gather their children together and announce to them what they had been discussing earlier that morning. It was agreed that Lara and David would spend the rest of their days on the island, while some of Captain Montrose's men will remain behind on the island to help them set up a trading post. Lara admitted that though she had high hopes of leaving the island, she realizes that she was happiest the most to stay on the island with her husband. David also informed his four children that they have a chance to accompany Captain Montrose back to England and explore different parts of the world, as well as meet other people, study, and settle down to marry and have families of their own. Ernst decides to accompany Captain Montrose back to England to study at a university, while Fritz volunteers to stay on the island and help his parents and Captain Montrose' men set up their new trading post. David states that Fritz is always stubborn and disobedient, but Emily promises David and his wife that she will make sure that Friz learns obedience. She and Fritz kiss, indicating that they have decided to stay on the island and get married much to the delight of Captain Montrose and the other Robinsons. David calls for a toast, to which he, Lara, Jacob, Sarah, Fritz, Ernst, Emily, and Captain Montrose propose to each others' families. Namatiti, who loads up his boat with supplies given to him by the Robinsons, looks back one last time and smiles with satisfaction at the happiness and content of the Robinsons and Montroses before he climbs into his boat and rows away back to his village.

Cast
 Liam Cunningham as David Robinson
 Brana Bajic as Lara Robinson
 Roger Allam as Thomas Blunt
 Jesse Spencer as Fritz Robinson
 Neil Newbon as Ernst Robinson
 Andrew Lee Potts as Jacob Robinson
 Charlie Lucas as Young Jacob
 Rided Lardpanna as Namatiti
 Jenna Harrison as Emily Montrose
 Emma Pierson as Sarah Robinson
 Bonnie Wright as Young Sarah
 Rupert Holliday-Evans as Roberts
 Francis Magee as Pickles

Critical reception

The film received positive reviews, with Dan Heaton of Digitally Obsessed saying, "Although I enjoyed the Disney version of Swiss Family Robinson as a small child, its one-dimensional characters quickly become tiresome as an adult. Luckily, Stranded crafts a much deeper story that should please both adults and older kids. Strong acting and well-fleshed characters make this lengthy Hallmark miniseries a worthwhile disc. If you give it a chance, this engaging tale of survival may surprise you".

Film Critic's Christopher Null gave four and a half stars (out of five) saying, "Hallmark has imbued Stranded with the appearance of big budget effects and an authenticity much like Cast Away, and though the Robinsons always had it easy compared to Hanks and Mr. Crusoe (thanks to the ship full of supplies which ran aground on the island with them), their adventure is thankfully, finally, made worth watching".

External links

2000s adventure drama films
Hallmark Channel original films
American adventure drama films
Films shot in Thailand
2002 television films
2002 films
Films based on The Swiss Family Robinson
Films set on islands
Films about survivors of seafaring accidents or incidents
2000s English-language films
2000s American films